Delftia deserti is a Gram-negative, short-rod and motile bacterium from the genus of Delftia which has been isolated from desert soil in Turpan in China.  D. deserti is of the Betaproteobacteria lineage within the Comamonadaceae family.

Biology and biochemistry
Delftia deserti cells are short rods and motile by means of one or two polar flagella. Cells are 1.06 ± 0.43 µm long and 0.75 ± 0.12 µm wide.

This bacterium has been cultured on TSA. It grows at temperatures 20-45 °C, optimally at 30 °C. Growth occurs at pH 6-9 (optimally at pH 7), and in 0–3.0% NaCl. D. deserti is fermentative, positive for DNase activity and nitrate reduction. It can hydrolyse starch, cellulose, casein, extracellular peptidoglycan, chitin, urea, esculin, and gelatin. D. deserti is an obligate aerobe.

There have been no reports of infection caused by D. deserti.

References

External links
Type strain of Delftia deserti at BacDive -  the Bacterial Diversity Metadatabase

Comamonadaceae
Bacteria described in 2015